Rowing at the 1932 Summer Olympics featured seven events. The competitions were held from August 9 to August 13 at the Marine Stadium in Long Beach, California.

Medal summary

Participating nations

A total of 152 rowers from 13 nations competed at the Los Angeles Games:

Medal table

References

External links
 International Olympic Committee medal database

 
1932 Summer Olympics events
1932
1932 in sports in California
1932 in rowing